The following is a list of 1977 Seattle Mariners draft picks. The list includes the June regular draft (Rule 4 draft), the June secondary draft, and the January regular draft, and January secondary draft. In all the drafts, the Mariners selected 17 pitchers, 13 outfielders, 4 catchers, 4 shortstops, 3 first baseman, 2 third basemen, 1 second baseman, 1 middle infielder for a combined total of 45 players in all drafts. Six selections by the Seattle Mariners in 1977 went on to play in Major League Baseball.

Drafts

Key

June regular draft

June secondary draft

January regular draft

January secondary draft

See also
List of Seattle Mariners first-round draft picks

References
General references

Inline citations

External links
Seattle Mariners official website